Santa Rosa is a town in Cameron County, Texas, United States. The population was 2,873 at the 2010 census. It is part of the Brownsville–Harlingen–Raymondville and the Matamoros–Brownsville metropolitan areas.

Geography

Santa Rosa is located in northwestern Cameron County at  (26.256651, –97.826673).

Climate

According to the Köppen Climate Classification system, Santa Rosa has a humid subtropical climate, abbreviated "Cfa" on climate maps.

Demographics

2020 census

As of the 2020 United States census, there were 2,450 people, 842 households, and 659 families residing in the town.

2000 census
As of the census of 2000, there were 2,833 people, 744 households, and 647 families residing in the town. The population density was 4,814.8 people per square mile (1,853.9/km2). There were 816 housing units at an average density of 1,386.8 per square mile (534.0/km2). The racial makeup of the town was 65.58% White, 0.56% African American, 0.95% Native American, 0.11% Asian, 29.97% from other races, and 2.82% from two or more races. Hispanic or Latino of any race were 95.66% of the population.

There were 744 households, out of which 54.6% had children under the age of 18 living with them, 62.0% were married couples living together, 20.6% had a female householder with no husband present, and 13.0% were non-families. 11.7% of all households were made up of individuals, and 6.2% had someone living alone who was 65 years of age or older. The average household size was 3.81 and the average family size was 4.17.

In the town, the population was spread out, with 38.5% under the age of 18, 11.0% from 18 to 24, 26.9% from 25 to 44, 15.2% from 45 to 64, and 8.3% who were 65 years of age or older. The median age was 25 years. For every 100 females, there were 89.5 males. For every 100 females age 18 and over, there were 84.3 males.

The median income for a household in the town was $21,154, and the median income for a family was $23,203. Males had a median income of $18,214 versus $13,882 for females. The per capita income for the town was $6,998. About 34.0% of families and 39.1% of the population were below the poverty line, including 50.3% of those under age 18 and 30.3% of those age 65 or over.

Government and infrastructure
The United States Postal Service operates the Santa Rosa Post Office.

Education
Santa Rosa is served by the Santa Rosa Independent School District.

In addition, South Texas Independent School District operates magnet schools that serve the community.

References

Towns in Cameron County, Texas
Towns in Texas